Pashang is the name of two separate characters in Persian Mythology. According to Ferdowsi's epic the Shahnameh, he is of the race of Tur the son of Fereydun and the father of Afrasiab. He was an early king of Turan. In Bal'ami's Tarikhnama he is the son of Gayumars, the first king in the world, and is murdered by demons. In some manuscripts the name is written Hushang.

References 
Iranian folklore
Shahnameh characters